The Kabaw Valley also known as Kubo valley is a highland valley in Myanmar's western Sagaing division, close to the border with India's Manipur. The valley is located between Heerok or Yoma ranges of mountains, which constitute the present day border of Manipur, and the Chindwin River (also called the Ningthi River). The valley is home to a number of ethnic groups including the Meitei (Kathe and Paona), the Maring tribe, the Thadou people, Kuki people, the Mizo, the Kadu and the Kanan.

During the First Anglo-Burmese War, the Manipuri prince Gambhir Singh conquered the Kabaw valley from Burma. It remained under Manipur control for several years. But the Burmans were able to prove to the British Resident, Major Burney, that the valley had been ceded to Burma by the former Manipur King Marjit Singh in 1813. The British were persuaded to hand the valley back to Burma in 1834. 
The British compensated Manipur for the loss of territory by annual subsidy. Lai (Hakha)

History

Kabaw Valley was the historical border between Awa, in present-day Myanmar, and Manipur, then known as Kangleipak or Meitrabak. King Kiyamba (1467-1508) and ally Chaopha Khe Chomba, king of nearby Pong, conquered Kabaw Valley in 1475. The valley is placed in Manipur according to maps published in Calcutta as late as 1852 It also need to be reminded that according to Treaty of Yandabo, Ningthee River was no doubt the natural boundary between Manipur and Burma. There was also an agreement between British and Manipur government in 1834 that if Kabaw valley under any circumstance revert to Manipur, the monthly allowance shall cease.

Communities

At the north end of the valley, lies the Manipuri town of Humine, with the first Burmese town being Zedi. The region is mixedly inhabited by the Meeteis, Nepalis, Kukis, Chins, Kados, and Kanans.

Moreh, India is the border town in the Manipur, India side while Tamu is in Myanmar. Both are being referred to as the twin border towns of trade in the border region.

See also
Hsawnghsup
Manipur (princely state)
History of Manipur

References

Valleys of Myanmar
Natural regions of Asia
History of Manipur